Asahel C. Kendrick (December 7, 1809 – October 21, 1895) was an American classicist, grammarian and exegete. He was the first professor of Greek at the University of Rochester. He was the author of textbooks on Greek grammar, and a contributor to the Revised Version of the New Testament.

Early life
Kendrick was born on December 7, 1809 in Poultney, Vermont. His father, Clark Kendrick, was a Baptist missionary. Kendrick graduated from Hamilton College in 1831.

Career
Kendrick began his career at Madison University, later known as Colgate University, as a professor of Greek and Latin. He taught Latin until 1850, when he became the first professor of Greek at the University of Rochester. Kendrick was also appointed as the executive officer while the trustees carried out their presidential search and appointed Martin Brewer Anderson. Kendrick spent 1852-1854 in Greece, Germany and Italy. He returned to the United States, and he held the Monroe professorship in Greek at the University of Rochester until 1885. He was the president of the American Philological Association and an associate fellow of the American Academy of Arts and Sciences in 1873. He authored textbooks about Greek grammar, including a revised version of The Principles of Greek Grammar by Peter Bullions.

Kendrick also taught Hebrew and New Testament interpretation at the Rochester Theological Seminary from 1865-1868. He served on the committee for the Revised Version of the New Testament from 1872 to 1880, and he wrote exegeses on the New Testament.

Personal life and death
Kendrick resided at 301 Alexander Street in Rochester, New York. He had a son and four daughters. His son, James Ryland Kendrick, taught Latin and Greek at the University of Rochester.

Kendrick died on October 21, 1895 in Rochester, New York.

Selected works

Further reading

References

External links
Works by Asahel C. Kendrick on the Internet Archive

1809 births
1895 deaths
People from Poultney (town), Vermont
People from Rochester, New York
Hamilton College (New York) alumni
Colgate University faculty
University of Rochester faculty
American classical scholars
American grammarians